Mykola Ivanovych Hulak (* 25 May 1821 Warsaw — † 8 June 1899) was a Ukrainian political and cultural activist, journalist, scientist, interpreter, lawyer.

References

External links 
 Hulak at the NANU Institute of History of Ukraine
 Hulak at the Encyclopedia of Ukraine

Ukrainian democracy activists
1821 births
1899 deaths
Ukrainian journalists
19th-century Ukrainian lawyers
Journalists from Warsaw
University of Tartu alumni
Ukrainian people in the Russian Empire
Brotherhood of Saints Cyril and Methodius members
Journalists from the Russian Empire
Russian male journalists
Male writers from the Russian Empire
Lawyers from the Russian Empire
Prisoners of Shlisselburg fortress